Viscainoa is a genus of flowering plants belonging to the family Zygophyllaceae. It is also in the subfamily of Morkillioideae.

It is native to north-western Mexico.

Known species:
 Viscainoa geniculata (Kellogg) Greene 
 Viscainoa pinnata (I.M.Johnst.) Gentry 

The genus name of Viscainoa is in honour of Sebastián Vizcaíno (1548 – c. 1625), a Spanish soldier, entrepreneur, explorer, and diplomat. 
It was first described and published in Pittonia Vol.1 on page 163 in 1888.

References

Zygophyllaceae
Rosid genera
Plants described in 1888
Flora of Northwestern Mexico